Defender is the thirteenth album and tenth studio album by Irish musician Rory Gallagher. Coming after a five-year hiatus from the recording studio, it was his first album released on the Capo label.

The song "Continental Op" was inspired by the nameless fictional detective created by Dashiell Hammett, and was dedicated to Hammett.

Track listing
All tracks composed by Rory Gallagher except where indicated.

Side one
"Kickback City" - 4:49
"Loanshark Blues" - 4:27
"Continental Op" - 4:33
"I Ain't No Saint" - 4:58
"Failsafe Day" - 4:23
Side two
"Road to Hell" _ 5:32
"Doing Time" - 4:06
"Smear Campaign" - 4:47
"Don't Start Me Talkin'" (Sonny Boy Williamson II) - 3:35 
"Seven Days" - 5:14
CD bonus tracks, also included as a bonus 7inch single on some issues of the LP
"Seems to Me" - 4:52 (Bonus)
"No Peace for the Wicked" - 4:09 (Bonus)

Personnel
Rory Gallagher – vocals, guitar, harmonica
Gerry McAvoy – bass guitar
Brendan O'Neill – drums
Invited guests
John Cooke – keyboards
Lou Martin – piano on "Seven Days"
Bob Andrews – piano on "Don't Start Me to Talkin'"
Mark Feltham – harmonica on "Don't Start Me to Talkin'"
Technical
Alan O'Duffy – production associate
Dónal Gallagher – executive producer

References

External links
Rory Gallagher's Official Site

1987 albums
Rory Gallagher albums
Albums produced by Rory Gallagher